Chapelwaite is an American horror television series based on the short story "Jerusalem's Lot" by American writer Stephen King. It is written by Peter and Jason Filardi, and premiered on Epix on August 22, 2021. The show has been renewed for a second season.

Premise 
Following his wife's tragic death at sea aboard a whaler ship, Captain Charles Boone (Adrien Brody) and his children return to the small town of Preacher's Corners, Maine, where a dark family history haunts them until confronted.

Cast and characters 
 Adrien Brody as Captain Charles Boone
 Emily Hampshire as Rebecca Morgan
 Jennifer Ens as Honor Boone
 Sirena Gulamgaus as Loa Boone
 Ian Ho as Tane Boone
 Eric Peterson as Samuel Gallup
 Christopher Heyerdahl as Jakub
 Julian Richings as Phillip Boone
 Steven McCarthy as Stephen Boone
 Gord Rand as Minister Burroughs
 Trina Corkum as Mary Dennison

Episodes

Production

Development 
In December 2019, it was reported that Epix had given a 10-episode straight-to-series order for an adaptation of "Jerusalem's Lot", with Jason Filardi and Peter Filardi set to write, and Donald De Line producing under De Line Productions. In February 2022, Epix renewed the show for a second season.

Casting 
In December 2019, Adrien Brody was cast in the leading role of Captain Charles Boone. In March 2020, Emily Hampshire joined the cast, set to play Rebecca Morgan.

Filming 
Chapelwaite was set to begin production in April 2020, in Halifax, Nova Scotia, but it had to be postponed due to the COVID-19 pandemic. Filming began in Halifax on July 5, 2020.

Release 
Chapelwaite premiered August 22, 2021 on Epix in the United States and CTV Sci-Fi Channel in Canada. In India, it is streaming on SonyLIV. In Britain, it is available on Paramount+.

Reception 
On the review aggregator website Rotten Tomatoes, 60% of 20 critics' reviews are positive, with an average rating of 6.20/10. The wesbite's consensus reads, Chapelwaite's drab proceedings are stretched a bit thin over ten episodes, but those looking for an atmospheric whodunit with a few genuine frights could do worse.

Notes and references

External links 
 

'Salem's Lot
Television shows set in Maine
Television shows based on works by Stephen King
Television shows based on short fiction
2020s American horror television series
2021 American television series debuts
MGM+ original programming
American horror fiction television series
Cthulhu Mythos stories
Television shows filmed in Halifax, Nova Scotia
English-language television shows
Television series by MGM Television
Television series by Sony Pictures Television